BC TSU is a professional basketball club based in Tbilisi, Georgia. It is affiliated with the Tbilisi State University.

History 
T.S.U. was one of the 11 founding members of the Georgian basketball league in 1991. Their best seasons in the league were 2009-10 and 2010-11, when they reached the playoff finals, losing both of them 1–3 against Energy Invest Rustavi and BC Armia respectively.

From 2015 to 2018, TSU-Hyundai played in Georgian A-Liga, winning it in 2018 and receiving a direct promotion to the Georgian Superliga.

The club's greatest success was winning the Georgian Cup in 2006. They also won the Korkia/Sakandelidze Memorial tournament twice in 2011 and 2019, and the Dudu Dadiani Memorial in 2019.

Team

Current roster

References

External links
 Eurobasket.com Team Profile 
 Superleague.ge Team Profile 

Basketball teams in Georgia (country)
Basketball teams established in 1991
Sport in Tbilisi